The Batum oblast was a province (oblast) of the Caucasus Viceroyalty of the Russian Empire, with the Black Sea port of Batum (present-day Batumi) as its administrative center. The Batum oblast roughly corresponded to most of present-day southwestern Georgia, and part of the Artvin Province of Turkey.

History
The Batum oblast was created out of the territories of the Ottoman Empire's sanjak of Batum following the region's annexation into the Russian Empire in the aftermath of the 1878 Russo-Turkish War. Established in 1878, the Batum Oblast was later downgraded to an okrug in 1883 and incorporated into the Kutais Governorate (until 1903).

According to the Treaty of Brest-Litovsk, the Russian SFSR ceded the Batum Oblast to the Ottoman Empire, however, the Transcaucasian Seim, the authority in Transcaucasia by 1918, rejected the treaty, opting to negotiate with the Ottoman Empire on its own terms. Such action led to the former's dissolution and the subsequent Treaty of Batum, which resulted in the inevitable reannexation of Batum to the Ottoman Empire.

After the Mudros Armistice, in which the Ottoman Empire was forced to withdraw its troops from the territories of the former Russian Transcaucasus including Batum, British troops under the 27th Division occupied the district to support the British military presence in the Transcaucasus, and to serve as a terminal for supplying Denikin's Volunteer Army.

The Batum Oblast was finally evacuated by the British in the summer of 1919, and handed over to the Democratic Republic of Georgia, whom administered the district until it was occupied by Turkish revolutionaries, leading to the Treaty of Kars which resulted in the partition of the district. The north including the port of Batum was retained by Georgia as an autonomy, and the southern Artvin district was incorporated into Turkey as the Artvin Province.

Administrative divisions 
The districts (okrugs) of the Batum oblast in 1917 were as follows:

Demographics

Russian Empire Census 
The plurality of the population indicated Georgian to be their mother tongue, with significant Turkish, Armenian and Russian speaking minorities.

Kavkazskiy kalendar 

See also 
 Batum Okrug
 Artvin Okrug
 Kars Oblast
 Treaty of San Stefano
 Treaty of Berlin (1878)

Notes

References

Bibliography 

 
Caucasus Viceroyalty (1801–1917)
Oblasts of the Russian Empire
Modern history of Georgia (country)
History of Adjara
19th century in Georgia (country)
1900s in Georgia (country)
1910s in Georgia (country)
States and territories established in 1878
States and territories disestablished in 1883
States and territories established in 1903
States and territories disestablished in 1917
1870s establishments in Georgia (country)
1917 disestablishments in Georgia (country)
1878 establishments in the Russian Empire
1880s disestablishments in the Russian Empire
1903 establishments in the Russian Empire
1917 disestablishments in Russia